Osazee Aghatise (born 12 November 2002) is a German professional footballer who plays as a midfielder for Derby County.

Club career
Osazee began playing football with Manchester United's academy where he stayed for 2 years, before moving to Manchester City's academy. In 2018 he moved to Stoke City's youth side, and then to Derby County's U18s in 2019. He made his professional debut with Derby County on 6 November 2021, coming on as a late substitute in a 1–1 EFL Championship tie with Millwall.

Personal life
He moved to England at the age of 7 where he spent the rest of his childhood.

References

External links
 
 

2002 births
Living people
Footballers from Bristol
German footballers
English footballers
German emigrants to the United Kingdom
German sportspeople of Nigerian descent
English people of Nigerian descent
Association football midfielders
Derby County F.C. players
Stoke City F.C. players
Manchester City F.C. players
English Football League players
21st-century German people